Saddle River may refer to:

Saddle River (Alberta), a tributary of the Peace River in Alberta, Canada
Saddle River (Passaic River tributary), New Jersey, U.S.
Saddle River, New Jersey, a borough in Bergen County, New Jersey, U.S.
Saddle River Township, a township in Bergen County, New Jersey
Upper Saddle River, New Jersey, a borough in Bergen County, New Jersey
Saddle River String Band, a bluegrass group from Prince Edward Island, Canada

See also